Rosa villosa, the apple rose, is a species of rose. It was described in 1753.

It is native to Europe, where it is found in the central, southern and southeastern parts of the continent, including southwestern Russia. It is most closely related to Rosa mollis, with which it is sometimes confused.

References

Linnaeus, C. 1753. Species Plantarum 1: 491.

External links
 

villosa
Flora of Europe
Garden plants of Europe
Plants described in 1753
Taxa named by Carl Linnaeus